Animal Soup is an album by Simon Townshend, the younger brother of The Who's guitarist Pete Townshend. The album was released in March 1999 and features Ben Townshend, Phil Spalding, James Hayto, Tony Lowe, Linz King among others.

The song "Blind As A Bat" was a song that Simon Townshend wrote when he was Six years old. It surfaced when Simon Townshend was in the studio in Philadelphia, and producer Andy Kravitz asked him to sing something he hated.

Track listings

Personnel
 Simon Townshend - Lead vocals, Acoustic guitar, Electric guitars, Keyboards and Backing vocals
 Ben Townshend - Drums, Percussion and Backing vocals
Additional musicians
 Phil Spalding - Bass guitar, Slide guitar, Electric guitar, Wah-wah guitar and Backing vocals on tracks 4, 8, 9, and 10
 James Hayto - Lead guitar, Wah-wah guitar, Rhythm guitar, Electric guitar on tracks 1, 2, 3, 6, 9, and 11, and Bass guitar on tracks 3, 6, and 11
 Tony Lowe - Lead guitar on tracks 4 and 5
 Linz King - Acoustic guitar and Backing vocals on track 5
 Andy Kravitz - Drums on track 5
 Jackie Norrie - Fiddle on track 2

References

1999 albums
Simon Townshend albums